Bolma andersoni, common name Anderson's star shell, is a species of sea snail, a marine gastropod mollusk in the family Turbinidae, the turban snails.

Description
The size of the shell varies between 50 mm and 87 mm.

Distribution
This species occurs in the Western Indian Ocean between Transkei and KwaZuluNatal.

References

  Beu A.G. & Ponder W.F. (1979) A revision of the species of Bolma Risso, 1826 (Gastropoda: Turbinidae). Records of the Australian Museum 32(1): 1-68
 Kilburn, R.N. & Rippey, E. (1982) Sea Shells of Southern Africa. Macmillan South Africa, Johannesburg, xi + 249 pp. page(s): 48
 Steyn, D.G. & Lussi, M. (1998) Marine Shells of South Africa. An Illustrated Collector’s Guide to Beached Shells. Ekogilde Publishers, Hartebeespoort, South Africa, ii + 264 pp. page(s): 26
 Williams, S.T. (2007). Origins and diversification of Indo-West Pacific marine fauna: evolutionary history and biogeography of turban shells (Gastropoda, Turbinidae). Biological Journal of the Linnean Society, 2007, 92, 573–592.
 Alf A. & Kreipl K. (2011) The family Turbinidae. Subfamilies Turbininae Rafinesque, 1815 and Prisogasterinae Hickman & McLean, 1990. In: G.T. Poppe & K. Groh (eds), A Conchological Iconography. Hackenheim: Conchbooks. pp. 1–82, pls 104–245.

External links
 Gastropods.com: Bolma (Bolma) andersoni

Endemic fauna of South Africa
andersoni
Gastropods described in 1902